The term cryptic pregnancy is used by medical professionals to describe a pregnancy that is not recognized by the person who is pregnant until they are in labor or have given birth. The term is also used online for a special form of false pregnancy (pseudocyesis), or delusion of pregnancy, in which a person who has no medical verification of pregnancy believes that they are pregnant.

Medically cryptic pregnancies 
The television series I Didn't Know I Was Pregnant shared the stories of women who had experienced medically cryptic pregnancies. They did not realize they were pregnant until they were in labor or had given birth. Nearly all the featured stories involved women who had intermittent bleeding throughout pregnancy that they misinterpreted as their period, while some cited not having regular periods due to polycystic ovarian syndrome (PCOS), or other conditions that are associated with infertility. The women involved often did not gain weight or experience other major symptoms of pregnancy, such as morning sickness or breast sensitivity. Those who did experience some symptoms of pregnancy either claimed to attribute the symptoms to an existing condition, claimed to have taken a home pregnancy test and gotten a negative result, or both.

A few of the stories involved women who had known they were pregnant and experienced an early miscarriage, only to realize they were still pregnant when the baby was being born. It is common that after the birth the new parent looks back and realizes that there were some signs of pregnancy they had ignored. For women who have had a typical pregnancy, the assumption is that there is no way to not "feel" a pregnancy. However, obstetricians on the show explained that, depending on the position of the placenta, the sensations of a baby moving can be minimal. In 2015, the show's spin off, I Still Didn't Know I Was Pregnant, featured women who had experienced multiple medically cryptic pregnancies.

Causes 
The causes of medically cryptic pregnancies are either physiological, that is, there were no recognizable symptoms of pregnancy, or can be due to psychological problems. For example, denied pregnancy is a condition in which a woman is mentally unable to accept that she is pregnant and so may go part way or all the way through a pregnancy unconscious of her pregnancy. This phenomenon is sometimes linked to other mental health diagnostic labels. However, denied pregnancy makes up only a proportion of all unknown pregnancies.

Epidemiology 
 The recent scientific research shows that 1 in 475 pregnancies can classify as a cryptic pregnancy, where pregnancy isn't discovered until at least 20 weeks.

 1 in 7,225 pregnancies are unknown at the time the mother gives birth.

References 

Pathology of pregnancy, childbirth and the puerperium
Delusional disorders
Motherhood